Theodore James "Ted" Kanavas (April 29, 1961 – July 3, 2017) was an American politician and businessman.

Biography
Kanavas was raised in Brookfield, Wisconsin and graduated from Brookfield East High School. He graduated from the University of Wisconsin–Madison in 1983. While attending the school, Kanavas worked as an aide to Congressman Jim Sensenbrenner. Kanavas subsequently attended Pepperdine University's school of law. Kanavas also worked in the software industry. He served on the Elmbrook School District Board from 1999 to 2002.

In July 2001, he was elected to the Wisconsin Senate as a Republican in a special election, defeating Democrat Dawn Marie Sass, and he was re-elected in 2002. On January 25, 2010, Kanavas announced he would not seek reelection.

In 2014, Kanavas co-founded Michael Best Strategies, a government relations and public policy firm. He died of cancer on July 3, 2017.

Notes

External links
Citizen Legislator Ted Kanavas' Blog
Follow the Money - Theodore J Kanavas
2006 2004 2002 campaign contributions

1961 births
2017 deaths
School board members in Wisconsin
Republican Party Wisconsin state senators
21st-century American politicians
People from Brookfield, Wisconsin
University of Wisconsin–Madison alumni
Pepperdine University School of Law alumni
Businesspeople from Wisconsin
Deaths from cancer in Wisconsin
20th-century American businesspeople
American people of Greek descent
Greek Orthodox Christians from the United States